Ginés García Millán (born on 10 September 1964) is a Spanish actor who has combined theater, film and television.

Biography 
Born on 10 September 1964 in Puerto Lumbreras, Murcia. His parents operated a hotel in the town. He was a footballer in his youth (playing in the Real Valladolid youth system). He learned his acting chops by training at the RESAD in Madrid.

Filmography 

Television
{| class="wikitable sortable"
|-
! Year
! Title
! Role
! class="unsortable" | Notes || 
|-
| 1995 || Médico de familia || || || align = "center" | 
|-
| 1996–1998 || Todos los hombres sois iguales || || || align = "center" | 
|-
| 2001–2002 || Periodistas || || || align = "center" | 
|-
| 2003 || Un lugar en el mundo || || || align = "center" | 
|-
| 2005 || Motivos personales || || || align = "center" | 
|-
| 2006–2007 || Matrimonio con hijos || || || align = "center" | 
|-
| 2007–2008 || Herederos || || || align = "center" | 
|-
| 2009–2010 || La señora || || || align = "center" | 
|-
| 2010 ||Adolfo Suárez, el presidente || Adolfo Suárez || TV movie aired as two-part miniseries || align = "center" | 
|-
| 2010 || Alta traición || || || align = "center" | 
|-
| 2011 || Tres días de abril || || || align = "center" | 
|-
| 2012 || Isabel || Juan Pacheco || || align = "center" | 
|-
| 2013 ||  || Mario || Introduced in season 2 || align = "center" | 
|-
| 2014 || Cuéntame cómo pasó || || || align = "center" | 
|-
| 2015 || Velvet || Esteban Márquez || Introduced in season 2 || align = "center" | 
|-
| 2018 || La verdad || Fernando García || || align = "center" | 
|-
| 2018 || Félix || Mario || || align = "center" | 
|-
| 2019 || Matadero || Pascual || || align = "center" | 
|-
| 2020 || El Cid || King Ramiro || || align = "center" | 
|-
| 2021 || Libertad || Pedro de Urquijo || || align = "center" | 
|-
| 2021 || ¿Quién mató a Sara? (Who Killed Sara?) || César Lazcano || Main cast|| align = "center" | 
|-
|}

 Theater 
 Kathie y el hipopótamo by Mario Vargas Llosa (2013-2014)
 Los hijos se han dormido (2012) 
 Glengarry Glen Ross (2009)
 Baraka (2006)
 Hamlet (2004)
 Don Juan Tenorio (2000)
 La fundación by Antonio Buero Vallejo (1998) 
 El rey Lear (1997-1998)
 Así que pasen cinco años'' (1989)

Filmography

References

External links
 

1964 births
Living people
20th-century Spanish male actors
21st-century Spanish male actors
Spanish male film actors
Spanish male stage actors
Spanish male television actors
Actors from the Region of Murcia